Listronotus is a genus of underwater weevils in the family Curculionidae. There are at least 100 described species in Listronotus.

See also
 List of Listronotus species

References

Further reading

 
 
 
 
 
 
 
 
 

Cyclominae